Trip For Tat is a 1960 Merrie Melodies animated short starring Looney Tunes characters Sylvester, Tweety, and Granny.

Summary
Although it contains a new plot, wherein Granny and Tweety travel to various locations (Paris, Swiss Alps, Japan, and Italy) while Sylvester tries to catch Tweety in every one, the cartoon is mostly made up of footage from previous cartoons.  Here are the cartoons which the short borrows animation from, in order of appearance:

 Tweety's S.O.S. (1951):  The entire boat sequence where Tweety tricked Sylvester into getting seasick and the piece of pork, further inducing the malady.
 Tree Cornered Tweety (1956): the following two:
- In the Alps, the sequence where Sylvester tries to catch Tweety (wearing spoons for snowshoes) on skis, but then crashed into a tree.

- In Japan, The sequence where Sylvester is chasing Tweety right to the bridge scene, but when he sawed open a hole, he and the cut floorboard fall down from a great height and into a fisherman's boat in the river (with the American fisherman changed to a stereotypical Japanese fisherman).
 Tweet Tweet Tweety (1951):  The sequence where Sylvester swings towards Tweety on a balcony while barely avoiding a construction pillar several times until he eventually got flattened.
 A Pizza Tweety Pie (1958):  The final sequence where Sylvester eats spaghetti in the restaurant after he vows to keep birds off his dietary list.

Notes
The only new animation in the short is at the beginning when the world tour is described to Granny, the finger painting sequence, when Sylvester is first in The Alps and Japan, and an alternate look of Tweety watching Sylvester sawing a hole on the bridge.

References

External links
 

1960 films
1960 short films
1960 comedy films
1960 adventure films
1960 animated films
1960s adventure comedy films
1960s English-language films
1960s Warner Bros. animated short films
American animated short films
American adventure comedy films
Compilation films
Merrie Melodies short films
Sylvester the Cat films
Tweety films
Japan in non-Japanese culture
Animated films set in Paris
Films set in the Alps
Films set in Switzerland
Animated films set in Japan
Animated films set in Italy
Films set on ships
Films set in restaurants
Short films directed by Friz Freleng
Films with screenplays by Michael Maltese
Films scored by Milt Franklyn
Warner Bros. Cartoons animated short films
Collage film